The 2018–19 AFC Bournemouth season is the club's fourth consecutive season in the top flight of English football and their 129th year in existence. This season Bournemouth will participate in the Premier League as well as the FA Cup and EFL Cup.

The season covers the period from 1 July 2018 to 30 June 2019.

Squad

Transfers

Transfers in

Transfers out

Loans in

Loans out

Pre-season

Competitions

Premier League

League table

Results summary

Results by matchday

Matches
On 14 June 2018, the Premier League fixtures for the forthcoming season were announced.

FA Cup
The third round draw was made live on BBC by Ruud Gullit and Paul Ince from Stamford Bridge on 3 December 2018.

EFL Cup
The second round draw was made from the Stadium of Light on 16 August. The third round draw was made on 30 August 2018 by David Seaman and Joleon Lescott. The fourth round draw was made live on Quest by Rachel Yankey and Rachel Riley on 29 September. The draw for the quarter-final was made live on Sky Sports by Jamie Redknapp and Jimmy Floyd Hasselbaink on 31 October.

Squad statistics

|-
! colspan=14 style=background:#dcdcdc; text-align:center|Goalkeepers

|-
! colspan=14 style=background:#dcdcdc; text-align:center|Defenders

|-
! colspan=14 style=background:#dcdcdc; text-align:center|Midfielders

|-
! colspan=14 style=background:#dcdcdc; text-align:center|Forwards

|-
! colspan=14 style=background:#dcdcdc; text-align:center|Players who have made an appearance or had a squad number this season but have left the club

|-
|}

References

A.F.C. Bournemouth
AFC Bournemouth seasons